Hyderodes is a genus of beetles in the family Dytiscidae, containing only these two species:

 Hyderodes crassus Sharp, 1882
 Hyderodes shuckardi Hope, 1838

Hyerodes crassus is found in southwestern Australia, and H. shuckardi is found in southeastern Australia and Tasmania.

References

Dytiscidae